Daniel Timo Prinz von Sachsen, Herzog zu Sachsen, Margrave of Meissen (born 23 June 1975), politician and entrepreneur, is the oldest son and heir of Rüdiger, Margrave of Meissen, a disputed Head of the deposed Royal House of Saxony. Daniel was a candidate to become King of Poland. He is a founder of the Wettin Forest Service and the Wettiner Golf Cup.

Early life

Daniel was born in Duisburg, Germany. His mother was Astrid Linke (1949–1989). He was raised in West Germany (Stein-Wingert), not returning to Dresden until well after the Berlin Wall came down. After secondary school, he joined the army, then studied business economics at RWTH Aachen University, and also trained in forestry.

Career

Together with his father Ruediger, he founded in 2003, and still runs, the Wettinische Forstverwaltung (Wettin Forest Service). He also organizes exhibitions at one of the family palaces, Moritzburg Castle (the acclaimed baroque "hunting lodge" for ancestor Frederick Augustus the Strong).

Since 2004 he has been a member of the municipal council of Moritzburg and the Kreis Meißen for the CDU party. In 2017, he removed himself as a candidate to become King of Poland, stating that, as a democrat, he is not interested in being a non-elected monarch.

Family and personal life

In 2001-2002, he was engaged to singer Christina Linhardt. Two songs on her CD Circus Sanctuary allude to their relationship.

In 2011, he married Sandra Scherer, a scientist. They had a daughter Anna-Catharina Sophie, born 2013, and a son, Gero Friedrich Johann, born 2015.

Daniel's hobbies include hunting, culture, art, new media, computers, Internet (he built the website for his family), history of Saxony, politics and golf.  He is a founder of the Wettiner Golf Cup.

Although his father's position as Head of the Royal House of Saxony was under dispute, the royal title has effectively become part of Daniel's name (Prinz von Sachsen) and he is still the elder descendant of the last reigning monarch of Saxony, in royal male lineage (an analogous situation applies for the head of the Prussian noble family, the House of Hohenzollern). The Royal House of Saxony, in the Albertine branch of the House of Wettin, is a deposed dynasty of German counts, dukes, prince-electors and kings that once ruled territories in the present-day German state of Saxony, and one of the oldest dynasties in Europe.

Ancestry

References

External links

Website of the House of Wettin 
Wettinische Forstverwaltung ((Wettin Forest Service)) 

1975 births
Living people
House of Wettin
People from Duisburg
German princes
Saxon princes